Bùi Xuân Phái (September 1, 1920 – June 24, 1988) was a Vietnamese painter. He is famous for the painting of Hanoi Old Quarters. He also painted the actors and musicians of Vietnamese opera.

Biography
The best known of all Vietnamese modern painters, Phai is respected and admired for both his art and moral character. Bui Xuan Phai's hometown is in Kim Hoang village, Van Canh commune, Hoai Duc district, old Ha Tay province. Phai was born into a typical family in Hanoi. Phai’s father, Bui Xuan Ho, was educated under the French colonial system and this brought intellectual reputation to his childrens. Growing up, Phai did not have a good relationship with his father. However, just before his father’s death, 20 years old Phai had sold his first painting in Hanoi and his other paintings had been selected for an exhibition in Tokyo, Japan. 

Phai was heavily influenced by the works of great European artists such as Picasso, Matisse, and Chagall. Phai often acknowledges the perspectives of these famous artists and always reminded himself of the importance of the contours of art regardless of his economic situation. Phai did not stick to only using canvas and paper to create his art but created his artworks virtually on any surface in which his drawings and paintings could cling. Despite Phai having a proper upbringing in life, he often traded drawings and paintings for needs to sustain his home and family. 

Phai’s early works portrays the soul of Hanoi’s in the 50s, 60s, and 70s. The style in Phai’s paintings often have bold outlines, putting emphasis and depth to depth and people. Through Phai’s paintings, he sends a message of memory, nostalgia, and sadness. In addition to painting the soul of Hanoi, he also painted portraits, countryside, nude, and still life. As previously mentioned, Phai painted on whatever he could get his hands on. For example, he painted on canvas, paper, wooden boards, and even newspapers, using various painting mediums such as oil paints, watercolors, pastels, charcoal, and pencil. All Phai’s works deeply express the Vietnamese soul, humanity, love for nature, sadness, and misery.  

Bui Xuan Phai unfortunately died on June 24th, 1988, in Hanoi, the place of his birth. In 1996, Phai was posthoumsly awarded the Ho Chi Minh Prize in Literature and Art.

Career 
In Phai’s youth, he drew cartoons for newspapers. He earned money from royalties and enrolled himself into the introductory course at the École Supérieure des Beaux-Arts d’Indochine. The principle at École Supérieure des Beaux-Arts d’Indochine was to train artists within the traditional thematic principles encompassing traditional arts. While being at École Supérieure des Beaux-Arts d’Indochine, Phai was in constant critique over his identity and found himself often involved with the principle instructor of painting. 2 years after graduating from École Supérieure des Beaux-Arts d’Indochine, Phai joined the August resistance in Hanoi and took part in artistic activities in Northern Vietnam from 1947 to 1952. In 1957, Phai became a member of the Vietnam Fine Arts Association. However, during the same time period, Phai los his teaching position at the Hanoi College of Fine Arts for supporting Nhan Van affair, a movement for political and cultural freedom and was not allowed to show his work in public until a solo exhibition in 1984.

Honors and Awards

Main Awards 

 Ho Chi Minh Prize in Literature and Art 1996 

 1946 National Fine Arts Exhibition Award

 National Fine Arts Exhibition Award 1980
 Leipzig Graphics Award (Germany)
 Capital Fine Arts Award in 1969, 1981, 1983, 1984

Others 

 Medal of Vietnamese Fine Arts 1997 
 On September 1st, 2019, Phai was honored by a Google Doodle on his 99th birthday.

Artworks

Main Artworks  

 Hanoi Old Quarters, 1972 (Oil painting)
 Resistance in Hanoi, 1966 (Oil painting)
 An Ox Cart in Old Quarter, 1972 (Oil painting)
 Deserted Street, 1981 (Oil painting)
 Make-up Before a Cheo Representation, 1968 (Oil painting)
 Cheo Stage, 1968 (Oil painting)
 A Cheo Couple, 1967 (Oil painting)
 Before Curtain Time, 1984 (Oil painting)

See also 
 Vietnamese art
 List of Vietnamese artists
 Culture of Vietnam 
 History of Vietnam

References

 Official website

1920 births
1988 deaths
Nhân Văn–Giai Phẩm affair
20th-century Vietnamese painters